MP da Last Don is a 1998 direct-to-video American crime film written, directed, produced and starring Master P on No Limit Films. Also appearing in the film were Silkk the Shocker, Mia X, C-Murder and Snoop Dogg. The film was a huge success as well as the studio album. It was one of No Limit Films biggest releases.

Cast
 Master P as Nino
 Silkk The Shocker as D.J.
 John Marlo as Rico
 Boz as Tony
 Varshini Soobiah as Alyssa
 Randall Bosley as Collins
 Mia X as Nicey
 James DiStefano as The Don
 C-Murder as Cuban Guard
 Snoop Dogg as Bar Patron
 Cody Jackson as Fat Boy
 Rena Riffel as Dancer

External links

1998 films
1998 crime drama films
Hood films
American crime drama films
Films directed by Master P
1990s English-language films
1990s American films